Slaughter of the Vampires is a 1962 Italian horror film written and directed  by Roberto Mauri. The film is set in 19th Century Austria where a newly wed couple of Wolfgang (Walter Brandi) and Louise (Graziella Granata) move in to a mysterious mansion. During a ball, Louise is bitten by the vampire baron of the mansion (Dieter Eppler).

The film was a low budget production, so much so that actor Dieter Eppler stated that many cast members were not paid for their work. The film was released in Italy where it grossed 36 million Italian lira. On its release in the United States it was titled Curse of the Blood Ghouls.

Plot
In 19th Century Austria, a newlywed couple, Marquis Wolfgang (Walter Brandi) and Louise (Graziella Granata), acquire a castle. To commemorate the occasion, Louise performs a piano piece she has written during a party. Louise then feels a strange sensation and retires to her room. She is visited by a vampire (Dieter Eppler) who she originally sees at the party she was in and sucks her blood, leading her to desire him. As a result, Louise's health declines, leading to Wolfgang seeking aid from Dr. Nietzsche (Luigi Batzella). Wolfgang is too late as when the doctor arrives, Louise is already dead. As the doctor diagnoses this, Wolfgang is shocked to find Louise alive as she approaches him and sucks his blood. The doctor later seeks out Louise's hiding place and stakes her to death, along with the servant Corrine, also a vampire. Wolfgang's hiding spot is not found as the doctor seeks another abode in the castle. Wolfgang, not entirely converted into a vampire, corners his adversary and stakes him with spikes of an iron grating.

Cast
 Walter Brandi as Marquis Wolfgang
 Dieter Eppler as the vampire 
 Graziella Granata as Louise
 Luigi Batzella as  Dr. Nietzsche
 Gena Gimmy as  Corinne
 Edda Ferronao as Nietzsche's maid
 Carla Foscari as  Teresa
 Maretta Procaccini as Resy
 Alfredo Rizzo as a servant

Production

Eppler was cast in the film via an international Dino De Laurentiis production. Through Laurentiis' brother, Eppler was cast as a police inspector in a film that never started production due to a lack of funds. Eppler described the film as a low budget production with actors not being paid. The film was shot in Castle d'Aquino in Monte San Giovanni Campano.

Release
Slaughter of the Vampires was distributed in Italy by Mercur Films when it was released on February 6, 1962. The film grossed a total of 36 million Italian lira on its theatrical run in Italy. The film was later released in the United States on June 4, 1969 as Curse of the Blood Ghouls.

Image Entertainment released a DVD of the film with the title Slaughter of the Vampires in 2005. A second DVD of the Slaughter of the Vampires was released in 2007 by Dark Sky with its full running time but was re-framed to fit 16 x 9 televisions.

Reception
In a contemporary review, The Monthly Film Bulletin described the film as "a remarkably un-chilling piece" noting poor acting and dubbing. The review concluded that the film was "so incredibly banal that it almost entertains."

In a retrospective review, Danny Shipka, author of Perverse Titillation: The Exploitation Cinema of Italy, Spain and France, 1960-1980 described Dieter Eppler's vampire character as "one of the campiest vampires in history" The review concluded that the "film is a hoot thanks to some of the most outlandish dubbing ever, making the film appear more like an MST3k episode than a serious thriller."

See also
List of Italian films of 1962
List of horror films of 1962
Vampire film

Notes

References

External links

1962 horror films
1962 films
Italian black-and-white films
Gothic horror films
Films set in Germany
Films set in the 19th century
Italian vampire films
Films directed by Roberto Mauri
Films set in castles
Films shot in Lazio
1960s Italian films